Giulian Ilie (born July 16, 1977) is a Romanian professional boxer living and fighting out of Rimini, Italy.

Professional career 
Ilie became the new IBF International cruiserweight champion, after scoring a split decision win over the rough stablemate, Cristian Dolzanelli (16-2-1, 10 KOs) on November 26, 2011, at the Local Sport Hall in Rezzato, Italy. It was a stunning upset, unheralded warrior Ilie outscored favorite Dolzanelli over twelve rounds, with a football-like atmosphere with competing fans screaming loudly to support their hero, the brave Dolzanelli was knocked down in the seventh round and was able to survive only thanks to his great lion heart. The local warrior tried to re-enter in the fight but Ilie was simply too strong and consistent during the others rounds and despite a strong final round from Dolzanelli, Ilie hung on to take the fight 114-113, 116-111, 113-114 on the judges’ scorecards. For the Romanian it was the first title of his pro career.

On 16 September 2011, Ilie, as underdog, stopped previously unbeaten Salvatore Erittu of Italy in round two and clinched the vacant IBF Inter-Continental title at 200 lbs. Ilie was coming from another win on Italian soil, having defeated Cristian Dolzanelli in December last year. Erittu (now 21-1) was supposed to restore the Italian pride but clearly Ilie had other plans as he started at full speed and tried to bring the fight to the much taller Erittu. After an even first round, Ilie was able to find his distance and connected with a clean right hook to Erittu’s chin: the Italian contender was up but still wobbled and, after another barrage by Ilie, referee Vincent Dupas of France stopped the fight for good.

Professional record 

|-
|align="center" colspan=8|21 Wins (6 knockouts, 15 decisions), 15 Losses, 2 Draws 
|-
|align=center style="border-style: none none solid solid; background: #e3e3e3"|Res.
|align=center style="border-style: none none solid solid; background: #e3e3e3"|Record
|align=center style="border-style: none none solid solid; background: #e3e3e3"|Opponent
|align=center style="border-style: none none solid solid; background: #e3e3e3"|Type
|align=center style="border-style: none none solid solid; background: #e3e3e3"|Rd., Time
|align=center style="border-style: none none solid solid; background: #e3e3e3"|Date
|align=center style="border-style: none none solid solid; background: #e3e3e3"|Location
|align=center style="border-style: none none solid solid; background: #e3e3e3"|Notes
|-align=center
|Loss
|21-15-2
|align=left| Nikolajs Grisunins
|TKO || 1 
| 2017-07-29 || align=left| SemaraH Hotel Lielupe, Jurmala, Latvia
|align=left| 
|-align=center
|Loss
|21-14-2
|align=left| Nikola Milacic
|UD || 4 
| 2017-03-18 || align=left| Baltiska Hallen, Malmo, Sweden
|align=left| 
|-align=center
|Loss
|21-13-2
|align=left| Nenad Pagonis
|UD || 8 
| 2017-03-04 || align=left| Boxcamp P1, Berlin, Germany
|align=left| 
|-align=center
|Loss
|21-12-2
|align=left| Arsen Goulamirian
|TKO || 2 
| 2016-10-22 || align=left| Casino de Deauville, Deauville, France
|align=left| 
|-align=center
|Loss
|21-11-2
|align=left| Michal Cieslak
|TKO || 2 
| 2016-09-17 || align=left| Ergo Arena, Gdansk
|align=left| 
|-align=center
|Win
|21-10-2
|align=left| Adrian Parlogea
|TKO || 2 
| 2016-06-29 || align=left| Gentlemen Fight Club Boxing House, Budapest
|align=left| 
|-align=center
|Loss
|20-10-2
|align=left| Denton Daley
|KO || 2 
| 2015-08-29 || align=left| Ontario
|align=left| 
|-align=center
|Loss
|20-9-2
|align=left| Imre Szello
|UD || 8 
| 2015-04-17 || align=left| Budakalász
|align=left| 
|-align=center
|Loss
|20-8-2
|align=left| Dmitry Kudryashov
|RTD || 2 
| 2014-10-18 || align=left| Rostov-na-Donu
|align=left| 
|-align=center
|Loss
|20-7-2
|align=left| Rakhim Chakhkiyev
|KO || 10 
| 2013-10-05 || align=left| Moscow
|align=left| 
|-align=center
|Win
|20-6-2 
|align=left| Gábor Nagy
| KO || 2 
| 2013-08-23 || align=left| Galați
|align=left| 
|-align=center
|Win
|19-6-2
|align=left| Péter Erdős 
| UD || 8 
| 2013-02-22 || align=left| Galați
|align=left|
|-align=center
|Loss
|18-6-2
|align=left| Nuri Seferi
| MD || 8 
| 2012-07-07 || align=left| Bern
|align=left|
|-align=center
|Loss
|18-5-2
|align=left| Paweł Kołodziej
| UD || 12 
|2012-03-17 || align=left| Krynica-Zdrój
|align=left|
|-align=center
|Win
|18-4-2
|align=left| Salvatore Erittu 
| TKO || 2 
|2011-09-16 || align=left| Arzachena
|align=left|
|-align=center
|Win
|17-4-2
|align=left| Cristian Dolzanelli 
| SD || 12 
|2010-11-26 || align=left| Rezzato
|align=left|
|-align=center
|Win
|16-4-2
|align=left| Marian Geroseanu 
| KO || 1 
|2010-09-18 || align=left| Ploiești
|align=left|
|-align=center
|Loss
|15-4-2
|align=left| Dawid Kostecki
| UD || 12 
|2010-04-24 || align=left| Gdynia
|align=left|
|-align=center
|Win
|15-3-2
|align=left| Jindrich Velecky 
| UD || 6 
|2010-04-16 || align=left| Hénin-Beaumont
|align=left|
|-align=center
|Loss
|14-3-2
|align=left| Vigan Mustafa 
| DQ || 6 
|2010-02-20 || align=left| Scandicci
|align=left|
|-align=center
|style="background: #B0C4DE"|Draw
|14-2-2
|align=left| Stefano Abatangelo 
| PTS || 6 
|2009-05-22 || align=left| Rezzato
|align=left|
|-align=center
|Win
|14-2-1
|align=left| Jevgenijs Andrejevs 
| UD || 4 
|2008-03-27 || align=left| Gothenburg
|align=left|
|-align=center
|Win
|13-2-1
|align=left| Lars Buchholz 
| UD || 4 
|2007-12-18 || align=left| Gothenburg
|align=left|
|-align=center
|Win
|12-2-1
|align=left| Kim Jenssen 
| UD || 4 
|2007-09-15 || align=left| Karlstad
|align=left|
|-align=center
|Win
|11-2-1
|align=left| Werner Kreiskott 
| UD || 4 
|2007-03-31 || align=left| Gothenburg
|align=left|
|-align=center
|style="background: #B0C4DE"|Draw
|10-2-1
|align=left| Josip Jalusic 
| PTS || 4 
|2007-01-27 || align=left| Gothenburg
|align=left|
|-align=center
|Loss
|10-2
|align=left| Tamas Popovics 
| PTS || 6 
|2005-12-10 || align=left| Győr
|align=left|
|-align=center
|Loss
|10-1
|align=left| Ladislav Kutil 
| SD || 12 
|2005-11-06 || align=left| Prague
|align=left|
|-align=center
|Win
|10-0
|align=left| Arpad Buzasi 
| TKO|| 2 
|2005-08-07 || align=left| Rimini
|align=left|
|-align=center
|Win
|9-0
|align=left| Selajdin Koxha 
| TD || 6 
|2005-07-03 || align=left| Pezzaze
|align=left|
|-align=center
|Win
|8-0
|align=left| Octavian Stoica 
| PTS || 6 
|2005-03-19 || align=left| Rimini
|align=left|
|-align=center
|Win
|7-0
|align=left| Gringo Mandache
| PTS || 6 
|2005-02-18 || align=left| Rovigo
|align=left|
|-align=center
|Win
|6-0
|align=left| Milojko Pivljanin 
| DQ || 4 
|2004-12-10 || align=left| Piacenza
|align=left|
|-align=center
|Win
|5-0
|align=left| Zoltan Kallai 
| PTS || 6 
|2004-11-12 || align=left| Collegno
|align=left|
|-align=center
|Win
|4-0
|align=left| Marco Fioravanti
| TKO || 5 
|2004-10-29 || align=left| Ariano nel Polesine
|align=left|
|-align=center
|Win
|3-0
|align=left| Peter Homola 
| TKO || 2 
|2004-07-17 || align=left| Paratico
|align=left|
|-align=center

References

External links 

Cruiserweight boxers
Romanian expatriates in Italy
1977 births
Living people
Sportspeople from Ploiești
Romanian male boxers